The Kamchatka constituency (No.45) is a Russian legislative constituency covering the entirety of Kamchatka Krai. The constituency previously occupied the whole territory of Kamchatka Oblast but after Kamchatka Oblast was merged with Koryak Autonomous Okrug in 2007 Kamchatka constituency absorbed the entirety of Koryak constituency.

Members elected

Election results

1993

|-
! colspan=2 style="background-color:#E9E9E9;text-align:left;vertical-align:top;" |Candidate
! style="background-color:#E9E9E9;text-align:left;vertical-align:top;" |Party
! style="background-color:#E9E9E9;text-align:right;" |Votes
! style="background-color:#E9E9E9;text-align:right;" |%
|-
|style="background-color:"|
|align=left|Aivars Lezdiņš
|align=left|Independent
|
|27.58%
|-
|style="background-color:"|
|align=left|Sergey Sharov
|align=left|Independent
| -
|17.30%
|-
| colspan="5" style="background-color:#E9E9E9;"|
|- style="font-weight:bold"
| colspan="3" style="text-align:left;" | Total
| 
| 100%
|-
| colspan="5" style="background-color:#E9E9E9;"|
|- style="font-weight:bold"
| colspan="4" |Source:
|
|}

1995

|-
! colspan=2 style="background-color:#E9E9E9;text-align:left;vertical-align:top;" |Candidate
! style="background-color:#E9E9E9;text-align:left;vertical-align:top;" |Party
! style="background-color:#E9E9E9;text-align:right;" |Votes
! style="background-color:#E9E9E9;text-align:right;" |%
|-
|style="background-color:"|
|align=left|Mikhail Zadornov
|align=left|Yabloko
|
|22.28%
|-
|style="background-color:"|
|align=left|Boris Oleynikov
|align=left|Independent
|
|14.47%
|-
|style="background-color:"|
|align=left|Nina Solodyakova
|align=left|Independent
|
|12.24%
|-
|style="background-color:"|
|align=left|Yekaterina Temchura
|align=left|Independent
|
|11.77%
|-
|style="background-color:"|
|align=left|Lyudmila Grigoryeva
|align=left|Independent
|
|7.94%
|-
|style="background-color:"|
|align=left|Vladimir Korneyev
|align=left|Liberal Democratic Party
|
|4.93%
|-
|style="background-color:"|
|align=left|Igor Belozertsev
|align=left|Independent
|
|4.84%
|-
|style="background-color:"|
|align=left|Viktor Yershov
|align=left|Independent
|
|4.51%
|-
|style="background-color:"|
|align=left|Sergey Grishin
|align=left|Independent
|
|3.70%
|-
|style="background-color:#1C1A0D"|
|align=left|Yury Eytigon
|align=left|Forward, Russia!
|
|1.59%
|-
|style="background-color:"|
|align=left|Valery Garnovsky
|align=left|Independent
|
|1.05%
|-
|style="background-color:#000000"|
|colspan=2 |against all
|
|9.22%
|-
| colspan="5" style="background-color:#E9E9E9;"|
|- style="font-weight:bold"
| colspan="3" style="text-align:left;" | Total
| 
| 100%
|-
| colspan="5" style="background-color:#E9E9E9;"|
|- style="font-weight:bold"
| colspan="4" |Source:
|
|}

1998

|-
! colspan=2 style="background-color:#E9E9E9;text-align:left;vertical-align:top;" |Candidate
! style="background-color:#E9E9E9;text-align:left;vertical-align:top;" |Party
! style="background-color:#E9E9E9;text-align:right;" |Votes
! style="background-color:#E9E9E9;text-align:right;" |%
|-
|style="background-color:"|
|align=left|Aleksandr Zaveryukha
|align=left|Independent
|
|20.17%
|-
|style="background-color:"|
|align=left|Vladislav Shved
|align=left|Independent
|
|17.81%
|-
|style="background-color:"|
|align=left|Yury Golenishchev
|align=left|Independent
|
|13.54%
|-
|style="background-color:"|
|align=left|Vladimir Obukhov
|align=left|Independent
|
|6.56%
|-
|style="background-color:"|
|align=left|Olga Sopova
|align=left|Independent
|
|5.95%
|-
|style="background-color:"|
|align=left|Kantemir Karamzin
|align=left|Independent
|
|4.35%
|-
|style="background-color:"|
|align=left|Vadim Maksimov
|align=left|Independent
|
|3.79%
|-
|style="background-color:"|
|align=left|Vyacheslav Lazarchuk
|align=left|Independent
|
|2.67%
|-
|style="background-color:"|
|align=left|Pyotr Ivanov
|align=left|Independent
|
|1.96%
|-
|style="background-color:#000000"|
|colspan=2 |against all
|
|20.12%
|-
| colspan="5" style="background-color:#E9E9E9;"|
|- style="font-weight:bold"
| colspan="3" style="text-align:left;" | Total
| 
| 100%
|-
| colspan="5" style="background-color:#E9E9E9;"|
|- style="font-weight:bold"
| colspan="4" |Source:
|
|}

1999
A by-election was scheduled after Against all line received the most votes.

|-
! colspan=2 style="background-color:#E9E9E9;text-align:left;vertical-align:top;" |Candidate
! style="background-color:#E9E9E9;text-align:left;vertical-align:top;" |Party
! style="background-color:#E9E9E9;text-align:right;" |Votes
! style="background-color:#E9E9E9;text-align:right;" |%
|-
|style="background-color:"|
|align=left|Yury Golenishchev
|align=left|Communist Party
|
|14.41%
|-
|style="background-color:"|
|align=left|Vladimir Boltenko
|align=left|Independent
|
|14.37%
|-
|style="background-color:#3B9EDF"|
|align=left|Valery Dorogin
|align=left|Fatherland – All Russia
|
|12.73%
|-
|style="background:"| 
|align=left|Irina Yarovaya
|align=left|Yabloko
|
|10.93%
|-
|style="background-color:"|
|align=left|Valery Kim
|align=left|Independent
|
|4.16%
|-
|style="background-color:"|
|align=left|Viktor Yershov
|align=left|Independent
|
|3.91%
|-
|style="background-color:"|
|align=left|Olga Chirkova
|align=left|Independent
|
|3.42%
|-
|style="background-color:"|
|align=left|Sergey Pavlov
|align=left|Independent
|
|3.37%
|-
|style="background-color:"|
|align=left|Aleksandr Pukalo
|align=left|Independent
|
|3.19%
|-
|style="background-color:"|
|align=left|Kantemir Karamzin
|align=left|Independent
|
|2.97%
|-
|style="background-color:"|
|align=left|Vladislav Shved
|align=left|Independent
|
|2.42%
|-
|style="background-color:"|
|align=left|Vladimir Semchev
|align=left|Independent
|
|2.33%
|-
|style="background-color:"|
|align=left|Ivan Dankulinets
|align=left|Independent
|
|2.11%
|-
|style="background-color:"|
|align=left|Aleksey Gurkin
|align=left|Independent
|
|1.17%
|-
|style="background-color:"|
|align=left|Aleksandr Bikbulatov
|align=left|Independent
|
|0.98%
|-
|style="background-color:#084284"|
|align=left|Valery Zimnukhov
|align=left|Spiritual Heritage
|
|0.20%
|-
|style="background-color:"|
|align=left|Pavel Mukhortov
|align=left|Independent
|
|0.14%
|-
|style="background-color:#000000"|
|colspan=2 |against all
|
|15.81%
|-
| colspan="5" style="background-color:#E9E9E9;"|
|- style="font-weight:bold"
| colspan="3" style="text-align:left;" | Total
| 
| 100%
|-
| colspan="5" style="background-color:#E9E9E9;"|
|- style="font-weight:bold"
| colspan="4" |Source:
|
|}

2000

|-
! colspan=2 style="background-color:#E9E9E9;text-align:left;vertical-align:top;" |Candidate
! style="background-color:#E9E9E9;text-align:left;vertical-align:top;" |Party
! style="background-color:#E9E9E9;text-align:right;" |Votes
! style="background-color:#E9E9E9;text-align:right;" |%
|-
|style="background-color:"|
|align=left|Valery Dorogin
|align=left|Independent
|
|27.60%
|-
|style="background-color:"|
|align=left|Yury Golenishchev
|align=left|Independent
|
|20.06%
|-
|style="background-color:"|
|align=left|Vladimir Boltenko
|align=left|Independent
|
|19.55%
|-
|style="background-color:"|
|align=left|Irina Yarovaya
|align=left|Independent
|
|9.66%
|-
|style="background-color:"|
|align=left|Aleksey Kazantsev
|align=left|Independent
|
|3.58%
|-
|style="background-color:"|
|align=left|Nikolay Pegin
|align=left|Independent
|
|2.74%
|-
|style="background-color:"|
|align=left|Vyacheslav Koroteyev
|align=left|Independent
|
|1.05%
|-
|style="background-color:"|
|align=left|Anatoly Ababko
|align=left|Independent
|
|0.45%
|-
|style="background-color:#000000"|
|colspan=2 |against all
|
|13.91%
|-
| colspan="5" style="background-color:#E9E9E9;"|
|- style="font-weight:bold"
| colspan="3" style="text-align:left;" | Total
| 
| 100%
|-
| colspan="5" style="background-color:#E9E9E9;"|
|- style="font-weight:bold"
| colspan="4" |Source:
|
|}

2003

|-
! colspan=2 style="background-color:#E9E9E9;text-align:left;vertical-align:top;" |Candidate
! style="background-color:#E9E9E9;text-align:left;vertical-align:top;" |Party
! style="background-color:#E9E9E9;text-align:right;" |Votes
! style="background-color:#E9E9E9;text-align:right;" |%
|-
|style="background-color:"|
|align=left|Viktor Zavarzin
|align=left|Independent
|
|24.88%
|-
|style="background-color:#7C73CC"|
|align=left|Valery Dorogin (incumbent)
|align=left|Great Russia–Eurasian Union
|
|23.50%
|-
|style="background:"| 
|align=left|Irina Yarovaya
|align=left|Yabloko
|
|20.33%
|-
|style="background-color:"|
|align=left|Viktor Kravchenko
|align=left|Independent
|
|5.46%
|-
|style="background-color:"|
|align=left|Svyatoslav Chayka
|align=left|Independent
|
|3.83%
|-
|style="background-color:"|
|align=left|Mikhail Yekimov
|align=left|Liberal Democratic Party
|
|3.23%
|-
|style="background-color:#164C8C"|
|align=left|Dmitry Bobrovskikh
|align=left|United Russian Party Rus'
|
|2.16%
|-
|style="background-color:"|
|align=left|Aleksandr Nikitin
|align=left|Agrarian Party
|
|1.68%
|-
|style="background-color:"|
|align=left|Vladimir Chayka
|align=left|Independent
|
|1.61%
|-
|style="background-color:#11007D"|
|align=left|Nadezhda Balyulina
|align=left|Conceptual Party "Unity"
|
|1.33%
|-
|style="background-color:"|
|align=left|Vladimir Shumanin
|align=left|Independent
|
|1.21%
|-
|style="background-color:#000000"|
|colspan=2 |against all
|
|10.02%
|-
| colspan="5" style="background-color:#E9E9E9;"|
|- style="font-weight:bold"
| colspan="3" style="text-align:left;" | Total
| 
| 100%
|-
| colspan="5" style="background-color:#E9E9E9;"|
|- style="font-weight:bold"
| colspan="4" |Source:
|
|}

2016

|-
! colspan=2 style="background-color:#E9E9E9;text-align:left;vertical-align:top;" |Candidate
! style="background-color:#E9E9E9;text-align:leftt;vertical-align:top;" |Party
! style="background-color:#E9E9E9;text-align:right;" |Votes
! style="background-color:#E9E9E9;text-align:right;" |%
|-
|style="background-color:"|
|align=left|Konstantin Slyshchenko
|align=left|United Russia
|
|38.35%
|-
|style="background-color:"|
|align=left|Valery Kalashnikov
|align=left|Liberal Democratic Party
|
|21.64%
|-
|style="background-color:"|
|align=left|Mikhail Smagin
|align=left|Communist Party
|
|10.89%
|-
|style="background-color: " |
|align=left|Mikhail Mashkovtsev
|align=left|Communists of Russia
|
|10.58%
|-
|style="background:"| 
|align=left|Mikhail Puchkovsky
|align=left|A Just Russia
|
|7.84%
|-
|style="background:"| 
|align=left|Vladimir Elchaparov
|align=left|Yabloko
|
|3.26%
|-
| colspan="5" style="background-color:#E9E9E9;"|
|- style="font-weight:bold"
| colspan="3" style="text-align:left;" | Total
| 
| 100%
|-
| colspan="5" style="background-color:#E9E9E9;"|
|- style="font-weight:bold"
| colspan="4" |Source:
|
|}

2021

|-
! colspan=2 style="background-color:#E9E9E9;text-align:left;vertical-align:top;" |Candidate
! style="background-color:#E9E9E9;text-align:left;vertical-align:top;" |Party
! style="background-color:#E9E9E9;text-align:right;" |Votes
! style="background-color:#E9E9E9;text-align:right;" |%
|-
|style="background-color:"|
|align=left|Irina Yarovaya
|align=left|United Russia
|
|40.43%
|-
|style="background-color:"|
|align=left|Roman Litvinov
|align=left|Communist Party
|
|19.05%
|-
|style="background-color:"|
|align=left|Valery Kalashnikov
|align=left|Liberal Democratic Party
|
|11.55%
|-
|style="background-color:"|
|align=left|Yekaterina Zaytseva
|align=left|New People
|
|10.61%
|-
|style="background-color: " |
|align=left|Dmitry Bobrovskikh
|align=left|A Just Russia — For Truth
|
|9.36%
|-
|style="background-color:"|
|align=left|Viktor Khomyakov
|align=left|Party of Pensioners
|
|4.23%
|-
| colspan="5" style="background-color:#E9E9E9;"|
|- style="font-weight:bold"
| colspan="3" style="text-align:left;" | Total
| 
| 100%
|-
| colspan="5" style="background-color:#E9E9E9;"|
|- style="font-weight:bold"
| colspan="4" |Source:
|
|}

Notes

References

Russian legislative constituencies
Politics of Kamchatka Krai